Yury Tsyhalka (born 27 May 1983) is a retired Belarusian footballer. His latest club was Shakhtyor Soligorsk. He has been capped three times for national team. He was a twin brother of Maksim Tsyhalka, also a former Belarus international.

Honours
Dinamo Minsk
Belarusian Premier League champion: 2004
Belarusian Cup winner: 2002–03

Dinamo Brest
Belarusian Cup winner: 2006–07

External links

1983 births
Living people
Belarusian footballers
Association football goalkeepers
Belarus international footballers
Belarusian expatriate footballers
Expatriate footballers in Kazakhstan
Belarusian expatriate sportspeople in Kazakhstan
Expatriate footballers in Romania
Liga I players
Twin sportspeople
Belarusian twins
FC Dinamo-Juni Minsk players
FC Dinamo Minsk players
FC Vostok players
CS Pandurii Târgu Jiu players
SCM Râmnicu Vâlcea players
FC Dynamo Brest players
FC Shakhtyor Soligorsk players
Footballers from Minsk